Austrian Mexicans are Mexican citizens of Austrian descent or Austrian-born people who reside in Mexico. Most immigrants arrived in the country when Austria as well as other Central European countries were part of the Austro-Hungarian Empire.

History 
19th century Austrians often settled in the northern regions of Mexico, where the German immigrants had already established themselves. Emperor Maximilian (1864-67) invited a small number of Jews from the Austria-Hungarian region and other European countries to settle in Mexico.

In 1938, around 1,500 Austrian immigrants arrived in Mexico. With diverse political origins, these Austrian refugees in Mexico were linked in their fight against fascism, at the time of the presidency of Manuel Ávila Camacho, the Austrian Republican Action Association of Mexico (aram).

Notable people 
Ana Casas Broda, photographer
Giuliana Olmos, professional tennis player
Rudolph Pokorny, chess player

See also 

 German Mexicans
 Austria–Mexico relations

References 

 
Austrian
Austrian
 
Ethnic groups in Mexico